Down to Earth is a British television situation comedy, aired in 1995 on BBC One.  It was devised by John Esmonde and Bob Larbey and starred Richard Briers, who also featured in Esmonde and Larbey's earlier series The Good Life (1975-1978) and Ever Decreasing Circles (1984-1989).  One series consisting of seven episodes was produced.

Plot
Richard Briers played Tony Fairfax, who upon graduating from the University of Oxford had been appointed as a "cultural advisor" in a South American banana republic (as a university friend was its president) and was used to a life of luxury, only to be exiled back to Britain when the regime was overthrown at the start of the series.  He moves in with his brother Chris (Christopher Blake), who finds him work at his landscape gardening business with limited success.

External links

Obituary of John Esmonde, in The Independent
Esmonde and Larbey: A Life in Comedy, Television Heaven

1995 British television series debuts
1995 British television series endings
1990s British sitcoms
BBC television sitcoms
English-language television shows